John Evans (born 12 February 1900) was an English footballer who played in the Football League for Sheffield United, Walsall and Stoke.

Career
Evans was born in Barking and played for West Bromwich Standard and Ewells before joining Walsall in 1921. He played once for the "Saddlers" and then played for Shrewsbury Town and two matches with Sheffield United before signing for Stoke in 1924. He played 12 times for Stoke in 1924–25 failing to make much of an impact and was released from the Victoria Ground at the end of the season. He then went on to play for Northwich Victoria, Shrewsbury Town and Stalybridge Connaughts .

Career statistics
Source:

References

English footballers
Sheffield United F.C. players
Shrewsbury Town F.C. players
Stoke City F.C. players
Walsall F.C. players
English Football League players
1900 births
Year of death missing
Northwich Victoria F.C. players
Association football forwards